Cape marigold is a common name for several plants and may refer to:

 Arctotheca calendula
 
 Dimorphotheca spp.